In Jainism, Sangha (Community of the pious) is a term used to refer to the fourfold community of Muni (male ascetics), Aryika / Sadhvi (female ascetics), Śrāvaka (laymen), and Śrāvikā (laywomen).

The word is also used in various other ways.

Meaning 

Champat Rai Jain, an influential 20th century Jain writer described the sangha as "those who practise the dharma", "the community of the saints", "the community of the pious" and as "the community of the faithful".

Significance 
According to the Jain texts, the sangha will be maintained till the very end of the present strife-ridden spoke of time (pancham kaal). With the end of the sangha, the dharma (religion) will also end.

Other Uses 

The word sangha has been used to refer to various lineages in the Digambara sect of Jainism.

History
Jain Sangha was established in Madurai in 5th century CE.

See also
Jainism
Sangha in Buddhism
 Sangat (Sikhism)

References

Citations

Sources